Texas Piano Man is the fifth studio album by American singer-songwriter Robert Ellis. It was released on February 14, 2019, by New West Records.

Track listing

Charts

References

2019 albums
New West Records albums